Gateway is the third full-length album by stoner metal band Bongzilla. It was released in September 2002 by Relapse Records. The title of the album is a reference to the term "gateway drug", used to describe an apparently more-benign drug that can lead to the use of more dangerous drugs.

Track listing

Personnel
 Muleboy - guitar, vocals
 Spanky -  guitar
 Cooter Brown -  bass
 Magma -  drums

References

Bongzilla albums
Relapse Records albums
2002 albums